Wang Center may refer to :

Wang Center for the Performing Arts, former name of the Citi Performing Arts Center, in Boston, Massachusetts
Charles B. Wang Center, a building on the campus of the State University of New York at Stony Brook